Osage Beach is a city in Camden and Miller counties in the U.S. state of Missouri. Most of the city is in Camden County, while a small eastern sliver is in Miller County.  The population was 4,351 at the 2010 census.

History
Osage Beach was incorporated in 1959.

During the 2020 COVID-19 pandemic Osage Beach gained international notoriety when on Memorial Day (May 25, 2020) a large crowd congregated at Lake of the Ozarks. The mayor at the time, John Olivarri, stated that there had been "no way to control" the situation.

Geography
Osage Beach is located at  (38.138354, -92.648678).

The city is located on the shores of the Lake of the Ozarks.

Demographics

2010 census
At the 2010 census there were 4,351 people, 2,038 households, and 1,166 families living in the city. The racial makeup of the city was 93.6% White, 1.1% African American, 0.6% Native American, 1.1% Asian, 0.2% Pacific Islander, 2.4% from other races, and 1.1% from two or more races. Hispanic or Latino of any race were 4.8%.

Of the 2,038 households 19.9% had children under the age of 18 living with them, 44.3% were married couples living together, 8.0% had a female householder with no husband present, 5.0% had a male householder with no wife present, and 42.8% were non-families. 35.3% of households were one person and 13% were one person aged 65 or older. The average household size was 2.04 and the average family size was 2.57.

The median age was 48.9 years. 15.8% of residents were under the age of 18; 8.6% were between the ages of 18 and 24; 20.2% were from 25 to 44; 31.3% were from 45 to 64; and 24% were 65 or older. The gender makeup of the city was 48.9% male and 51.1% female.

2000 census
At the 2000 census there were 3,662 people, 1,687 households, and 1,035 families living in the city. The population density was 389.8 people per square mile (150.4/km). There were 4,055 housing units at an average density of 431.6 per square mile (166.6/km).  The racial makeup of the city was 97.35% White, 0.76% African American, 0.41% Native American, 0.49% Asian, 0.16% from other races, and 0.82% from two or more races. Hispanic or Latino of any race were 1.20% of the total population.
Of the 1,687 households 19.1% had children under the age of 18 living with them, 51.2% were married couples living together, 7.2% had a female householder with no husband present, and 38.6% were non-families. 31.6% of households were one person and 10.9% were one person aged 65 or older. The average household size was 2.09 and the average family size was 2.58.

The age distribution was 16.0% under the age of 18, 7.4% from 18 to 24, 26.9% from 25 to 44, 29.3% from 45 to 64, and 20.3% 65 or older. The median age was 45 years. For every 100 females there were 96.8 males. For every 100 females age 18 and over, there were 94.9 males.

The median household income was $38,448 and the median family income  was $49,554. Males had a median income of $30,444 versus $21,440 for females. The per capita income for the city was $22,685. About 4.5% of families and 6.7% of the population were below the poverty line, including 5.3% of those under age 18 and 6.4% of those age 65 or over.

Education

Schools
Osage Beach Elementary-Camdenton R-III 
School of the Osage (Miller County R-II School District)

Colleges and universities
Columbia College - Lake of the Ozarks campus
State Fair Community College - Lake of the Ozarks campus
Central Methodist University - Lake of the Ozarks campus

Library
Osage Beach has a public library, the Osage Beach Library.

Media

Osage Beach is split between two television markets.  While Camden County is part of the Springfield television market, Miller County is part of the Columbia/Jefferson City market.  Charter Communications' cable system carries stations from both cities.  DirecTV and Dish Network subscribers in the city receive Springfield stations, mainly because the bulk of the city is in Camden County.

Television
The following is a list of television stations that broadcast from and/or are licensed to Osage Beach, Missouri.

Radio
The following is a list of radio stations that broadcast from and/or are licensed to Osage Beach, Missouri.

Transportation

US Route 54 runs through Osage Beach. US Route 54 runs north to Jefferson City. US Route 54 runs south to Camdenton.

Infrastructure
As Osage Beach is predominantly a resort town, as such it boasts several tourist attractions and amenities, including an outlet mall with brands such as J Crew, Coach, and Sunglass Hut.

Healthcare
Osage Beach is home to Lake Regional Hospital. Part of the Lake Regional Health system, this general medical and surgical hospital houses a trauma center and has a total of 116 beds.

In popular media
The TV series Ozark is set in Osage Beach. In November 2017, it was reported that the series helped increase tourism and notoriety of the Lake of the Ozarks, but did not have a significant economic impact. In February 2018, a restaurant called "Marty Byrde's" was opened in Lake Ozark, Missouri, that is inspired by the series, and includes menu items based on the show, including "Ruth's Smoked Wings".

References

External links
 City of Osage Beach official website

Cities in Camden County, Missouri
Cities in Miller County, Missouri
Cities in Missouri